Comedian Harmonists (English title: The Harmonists) is a 1997 German film, directed by Joseph Vilsmaier, about the popular German vocal group the Comedian Harmonists of the 1920s and 1930s. The film was  supported by the German and Austrian film fund.

Plot
In 1927, unemployed German-Jewish actor Harry Frommermann is inspired by the American group The Revelers to create a German group of the same format. He holds auditions and signs on four additional singers and a pianist. Naming themselves the "Comedian Harmonists", they meet international fame and popularity. However, they eventually run into trouble when the Nazis come to power, as half the group is Jewish.

Cast
 Ben Becker as  Robert Biberti
 Heino Ferch as Roman Cycowski
 Ulrich Noethen as Harry Frommermann
 Heinrich Schafmeister as Erich A. Collin
 Max Tidof as Ari Leschnikoff
 Kai Wiesinger as Erwin Bootz
 Meret Becker as Erna Eggstein
 Katja Riemann as Mary Cycowski
 Noemi Fischer as Chantal, Collin's girl friend
 Dana Vávrová as Ursula Bootz
 Otto Sander as Bruno Levy
 Michaela Rosen as Ramona, brothel madame
 Günter Lamprecht as Erik Charell
 Gérard Samaan as Roman's father
 Rolf Hoppe as Gauleiter Streicher
 Jürgen Schornagel as Reichsmusikdirektor
 Rudolf Wessely as Mr. Grünbaum
 Susi Nicoletti as Mrs. Grünbaum
 Giora Feidman as clarinet player
 Kathie Lindner as wardrobe mistress
 Trude Ackermann as Robert's mother

Reception
Comedian Harmonists succeeded in Europe and was the highest-grossing German film of 1998 with a gross of over $16 million. U.S. President Bill Clinton told critic Roger Ebert it was among his favorite films of the year, although the movie did not get widespread release, hence reception in the United States.

Bernd Reinhardt of the World Socialist Web Site called it "an exciting film which is well worth seeing and which pays proper attention to the sextet's music."  He also remarked on the film's attention to historical detail and the importance of its theme of musical internationalism.

Awards and nominations
At the 1998 German Film Awards, Comedian Harmonists won the awards for Best Fiction Film, Best Editing (for Peter R. Adam), Best Actor (for Ulrich Noethen), Best Supporting Actress (for Meret Becker), and Best Production Design (for Rolf Zehetbauer). Joseph Vilsmaier was nominated for Best Direction, losing to Wim Wenders for The End of Violence.
At the 1998 Bavarian Film Awards Joseph Vilsmaier won the awards for Best Director. Ben Becker, Heino Ferch, Ulrich Noethen, Heinrich Schafmeister, Max Tidof and Kai Wiesinger won a Special Prize

Vilsmaier was nominated for Best Cinematographer for Comedian Harmonists at the 1998 European Film Awards.

American version
The U.S. Miramax release contains at least one difference from the original: in the original, there is a scene, when the Harmonists arrive in New York and perform in front of the U.S. Navy, where the camera singles out one African American navy man who is visibly enjoying the music, until he gets a stinging look of rebuke from a superior officer. This segment was cut from the American release.

Legacy
The film led to the writing of a musical play, Veronika, der Lenz ist da – Die Comedian Harmonists, which opened at the Komödie on the Kurfürstendamm in Berlin on 19 December 1997. When this production closed, the actors who had played the original sextet formed themselves into a new group called the Berlin Comedian Harmonists, which is still in existence in 2021.

Notes

External links

1997 films
1990s biographical films
Biographical films about singers
Films about musical groups
Films directed by Joseph Vilsmaier
Films scored by Harald Kloser
Films set in Berlin
Films set in the 1920s
Films set in the 1930s
Films about Nazi Germany
German biographical films
Jazz films
Cultural depictions of classical musicians
Cultural depictions of jazz musicians
Cultural depictions of German men
1990s German films